Jay Chauhan (born 6 October 1992) is an Indian cricketer who plays for Saurashtra. He made his first-class debut for Saurashtra in the 2016-17 Ranji Trophy on 29 November 2016. He made his List A debut for Saurashtra in the 2018–19 Vijay Hazare Trophy on 6 October 2018. He made his Twenty20 debut for Saurashtra in the 2018–19 Syed Mushtaq Ali Trophy on 24 February 2019.

References

External links
 

1992 births
Living people
Indian cricketers
Saurashtra cricketers